Condica aroana is a moth in the family Noctuidae that occurs in Australia and Borneo.

Description
There is a kidney shaped mark in the center of each forewing, the hindwings are brown with darker brown veins. They have buff speckled dark brown wings that are 20mm in length.

References

 
 
  

Moths of Australia
Condicinae
Moths of Indonesia
Moths described in 1906